Saints & Sinners is the fifth studio album by English hard rock band Whitesnake, released in November 1982. It peaked at number 9 on the UK Albums Chart.

Two of the tracks, "Crying in the Rain" and "Here I Go Again", were later re-recorded for their self-titled 1987 album.

Production and recording
The recording process began in 1981, just after the end of the Come an' Get It tour. However, tension within the band was beginning to appear. Micky Moody stated in a 1997 interview that:

Moody quit the band in December 1981, and soon afterwards David Coverdale called a meeting with all Whitesnake members and put the band on hold. Coverdale was also worried about the lack of financial reward the band were having, and decided to put the band on hold to dissociate Whitesnake from their manager John Coletta (who had also been Deep Purple's manager from 1968 to 1976). After this parting of ways, Coverdale temporarily took over Whitesnake's business side.

During 1982, the news began to filter through the music newspapers and magazines: guitarist Bernie Marsden also quit Whitesnake, as well as bassist Neil Murray and drummer Ian Paice. Only Jon Lord stuck with David Coverdale. However, Bernie Marsden states in his autobiography that the rest of the band were called to a meeting to be told that they were "no longer a part of Whitesnake".

In August 1982 David Coverdale called Micky Moody and asked him to return to the band. According to Moody, "towards the end of 82, David rang me up and said 'we wanna finish the Saints & Sinners album and we need to do some backing vocals, etc." There were also three new members in the band, namely former Trapeze guitarist Mel Galley, former Rainbow drummer Cozy Powell and Colin Hodgkinson on bass guitar.

As the album was almost finished, the only contribution of the new line-up to Saints & Sinners were the backing vocals recorded by Galley along with Moody at Battery Studios in London; Ian Paice's drum parts and Neil Murray's bass tracks were left untouched.

Track listing

Personnel

Whitesnake
 David Coverdale – lead vocals
 Micky Moody – guitar, backing vocals
 Bernie Marsden – guitar
 Neil Murray – bass
 Ian Paice – drums, percussion
 Jon Lord – keyboards

Additional musicians
 Mel Galley – backing vocals

Production
Martin Birch - producer, engineer, mixing at Battery Studios, September/October 1982
 Guy Bidmead - engineer
 Bryan New - assistant engineer
 Steve Angel – mastering
 Peter Mew - remastering at Abbey Road Studios, London, 2007

Charts

Album

Singles
Here I Go Again

Certifications

References

1982 albums
Whitesnake albums
Geffen Records albums
Albums produced by Martin Birch
Polydor Records albums
Liberty Records albums
Warner Records albums
Hard rock albums by English artists
Blues rock albums by English artists